Eupithecia suboxydata is a moth in the family Geometridae. It is found in the eastern Palearctic realm, west to south-eastern Russia and the southern Urals.

References

Moths described in 1897
suboxydata
Moths of Europe
Moths of Asia